Zoo was a British (and formerly an Australian and South African) lad's mag published weekly by Bauer Media Group in the United Kingdom. It was launched on 29 January 2004, and for a time was the UK's only men's weekly after the similar and rival magazine Nuts closed in April 2014.

On 17 November 2015, Zoo announced on its website that it would be suspending publication.

Zoo consisted of a mix of comedy news, sports commentary, photos of glamour models, jokes (of the pub joke style), an entertainments guide (covering TV, cinema, video/computer games and music), fashion/grooming and comical/rude pictures sent in by readers.

UK edition
Zoo was a weekly news magazine aimed at the male market. It was launched on 29 January 2004, as the second weekly men's magazine in the UK (the first being the similar and rival magazine; Nuts). The magazine was published by German company Bauer Media Group.

The Zoo website was a continuation of the magazine's content that also included original articles, videos and photo galleries. Readers were also invited to create a profile and post pictures via the "Zoo Bloggers" section.

Withdrawal from Co-op supermarket
On 8 August 2013, a spokesman for Bauer Media announced that it would not be placing Zoo in 'modesty bags'.  The announcement came after the UK's Co-op supermarkets asked for publishers of 'lads mags' to mask their explicit front covers or face being taken off the shelves. The Co-op said that it was responding to consumer concern. As a result of Bauer Media's decision, the Co-op ceased to stock Zoo in its stores.

Suspension of publication
On 17 November 2015, Zoo announced that it would be suspending publication alongside that of fellow men's magazine FHM.

International editions

Australia
An Australian edition of Zoo was introduced on 20 February 2006, with a special promotional issue that was free of charge. The first official issue came out a week later on 27 February. It featured Krystal Forscutt and former cricketer David Boon as columnists, as well as many of the same features as its British counterpart, except the sport commentary was mainly about rugby league and Australian rules football.

Spokesperson/models used regularly in Zoo Weekly included Brooke Evers and former Big Brother Australia contestants Krystal Forscutt, Emma Cornell and Susannah Murray. Resident sex and relationship advice columnists for 2009–2010 were "The Threesome" of  Monica Lee Paige, Bonnie Edwards and Ardina Voogt. From 2012 the sex and relationship advice column was presented by regular cover model, Ashlee Adams.

In May 2006, Australian model Lara Bingle took legal action against EMAP Australia, the publisher of Zoo Weekly, claiming defamation by the magazine when it allegedly published photographs of the model without her permission in the 27 March 2006 issue.

On 16 September 2007, it was reported that professional golfer Nikki Garrett had instructed her lawyers to begin an action against Zoo Weekly in the Australian Federal Court. The matter related to the 29 January 2007 edition of Zoo Weekly in which a photo of Garrett — taken for a charity fund-raiser — was reproduced in the magazine accompanied by an allegedly-salacious caption.

On 17 September 2015, Bauer Media issued a press release confirming the closure of the Australian weekly edition  with effect from Monday 12 October 2015. The closure of Zoo Weekly magazine encompassed all platforms: print, website and social media assets.

South Africa
Following the successes of Zoo Weekly in the United Kingdom and Australia, the South African edition launched on 6 October 2006 under a joint venture between UK publisher EMAP Consumer Media and South African media giant Media24. The magazine was published in both English, as Zoo Weekly, and Afrikaans, as Zoo Weekliks. The edition was discontinued by February 2008.

See also
 Zip (magazine)
 Ralph
 Lad culture
 Playboy

References

External links
 Zoo Weekly UK
 Zoo Weekly Australian edition
 Stealing content

Bauer Media Group
Men's magazines published in Australia
Men's magazines published in the United Kingdom
Defunct magazines published in South Africa
Bauer Group (UK)
Weekly magazines published in the United Kingdom
2004 establishments in the United Kingdom
Magazines established in 2004
Defunct magazines published in Australia
Magazines disestablished in 2015
Defunct magazines published in the United Kingdom